My Father is Strange is a 2017 South Korean television series starring Kim Yeong-cheol, Kim Hae-sook, Ryu Soo-young, Lee Yu-ri, Lee Joon, Jung So-min, Min Jin-woong, Ryu Hwa-young, and Ahn Hyo-seop. The series aired on KBS2 every Saturday and Sunday from 7:55 p.m. to 9:15 p.m. (KST). The TV series gained huge popularity and was extended by 2 episodes (original 50).

Synopsis
About a middle class family that lives on the outskirts of Seoul which consists of the father, his wife, their three daughters, and their one son. However, one day, a young man, who is a celebrity, shows up at the household claiming that he is the son of the family.

Cast

Main
 Kim Yeong-cheol as Byun Han-su/Lee Yoon-seok (60) — He is the owner of Father's Snack Bar and the patriarch of the family. He was a former Judo player back in high school but after being accused of a crime he did not do, he ended up going to jail and ruining his future. His identity was changed to Byun Han-soo after getting his identity switched with his best friend due to an accident. He was forced to keep this new identity after his wife Young-shil got pregnant with Joon-young, and decided that living as Byun Han-su would give him the opportunity to restart his life and save his children from the repercussions of being known as a criminal's children. Years later, when Ahn Joong-hee tracks him down, he learns that Joong-hee is the real Han-su's son and could not refuse Joong-hee's request to move in with him and his family out of guilt for the identity switch, and he decides to be the father that Joong-hee never had. He eventually grows to love Joong-hee and cares for him sincerely like his own son. They eventually become a real family when Joong-hee decides to marry Mi-yeong. With the help of his daughter Hye-young, Yoon-seok manages to clear his name and at the end of the series, he reverts to his actual name, and manages to get a driver's licence for the first time. 
 Kim Hae-sook as Na Young-sil (58) — Lee Yoon-seok's wife and the matriarch of the family. She helps Yoon-seok with the snack bar while raising her four children. She first met her husband at a hospital while she was working as a nurse. She was also the only one who believed his innocence and stood by him after he was released from jail. After learning that she was pregnant with Joon-young, she begged Yoon-seok to maintain his new identity as Byun Han-su for the sake of their child and his future. She is known to be very protective of her family and goes to great lengths to ensure that their children never learned of their father's true identity. She also does the driving for her husband since due to his switched identity, he could not obtain a driver's licence. 
Ryu Soo-young as Cha Jeong-hwan (38)— The only child of Cha Gyu-taek and Oh Bok-nyeo. Even though he works as a PD at KBC studios, his show is losing popularity which caused the company to cancel his show. He was in a relationship with Hye-young while they were in college but broke up after his mother forced Hye-young to break up with him. He eventually gets back together with Hye-young and they get married, despite his mother's strong disapproval of her. He also manages to come up with a new show about marriage counseling after being inspired by his own parents, and the show goes on to receive good ratings, which revives his career. He is shown to be fully supportive of Hye-young and her career, and even provides support and assistance when she was working on clearing her father's name.
 Lee Yu-ri as Byeon Hye-yeong/Lee Hye-yeong (34)—She is a lawyer and Lee Yoon-seok's and Na Young-shil's eldest daughter and 2nd child. She dated Cha Jung-hwan back in college but broke up after Jung-hwan's mother forced her to break up with him. After sleeping with him from fighting, they decide to start dating again and they eventually get married. Her personality is known for acting pretty while she is working. Hye-young eventually is the person responsible for restoring her father's good name as she embarks on the arduous task of proving his innocence from a case that happened a long time ago. Hye-young also gains fame from her success with her father's case, giving her access to more clients. 
Lee Joon as Ahn Joong-hee (36)— He is an idol-singer turned actor at Gabi Entertainment and the real Byun Han-soo's son. He lived in the U.S before moving to Korea to become an idol. Although he is an actor, he could not really act well which caused him to miss out on opportunities on doing more popular acting jobs like a mini series. After finally being cast on one, he decided to move with the Byuns/Lees, to know what it is like living with his “father", to help him with his acting. Living with the Byuns/Lees actually improves his acting skill and his image so much that he becomes famous again. He later starts to fall for Mi-young which causes him to believe that he is crazy because she is supposed to be his half-sister. He struggles with his feelings for Mi-Young and his anger at her father for posing as his father and betraying his trust. Eventually, he learns to forgive Yoon-seok and his wife Young-sil for their betrayal as he understands their reasons and he also has grown to love the family like his own. He also gets together with Mi-Yeong and they become engaged at the end of the series.
 Jung So-min as Byeon Mi-yeong/Lee Mi-yeong (31) — She is Lee Yoon-seok and Na Young-shil's 2nd daughter and the 3rd child of the family. She is a former Judo athlete and after suffering from a career-ending shoulder injury, became depressed, which caused her to be overweight. After deciding to start her life again, she decides to lose weight and find a job. She eventually gets a job as an intern at Gabi Entertainment and later as Ahn Joong-hee's manager. Although she gets a job at Gabi Entertainment, she is having troubles working there since a girl named Kim Yoo-joo who bullied her back in high school due to her weight, works there. Kim Yoo Joo also holds a more senior position in the company, and even ends up getting pregnant by and marries her brother, adding to her woes. She eventually changes her mind on Yoo-joo and truly forgives and accepts her after Yoo-joo finally shows remorse and apologizes for her past actions. She also begins to develop feelings for Ahn Joong-hee, causing great inner turmoils as she believes that they are half siblings. After the whole truth on her father's real identity is revealed, Mi-Yeong and Joong-Hee finally get together and later become engaged. She is also implied to have gotten a permanent job with another entertainment company.
Min Jin-woong as Byun Joon-young/Lee Joon-young (35) — He is a 9th Grade Civil Servant and Lee Yoon-seok and Na Young-shil's oldest son and 1st child. He has been taking and studying his Civil Servant exam for almost 5 years and he eventually passes the test his 5th year. He has been dating Kim Yoo-joo while studying for his exam but after getting her pregnant by accident, they decide to get married. Initially shown as irresponsible, Joon-young eventually changes and steps up to the plate to become the eldest child of the family during their toughest time. He is also shown to possess great dislike for Joong-hee, as he seems to feel inferior to Joong-hee in every aspect, even though he changes his mind about him later, and starts to become nice and caring to Joong-hee. 
Oh Jae-moo as young Byun Joon-young
 Ryu Hwa-young as Byeon Ra-yeong/Lee Ra-yeong (27) — She is a yoga instructor and Lee Yoon-seok and Na Young-shil's youngest daughter and 4th child. She is always known for using her social media account constantly and is always the first one to find out her siblings’ dating secret. She meets Park Chul-soo when he gets a job as a soccer coach at the training center she works at. She at first thought he was gay after mistaking his twin brother as his boyfriend. She eventually starts to date him after he confesses his attraction to her. Eventually, she discovers her talent in sales and works at Chul-soo's father's company at the home shopping section.
 Ahn Hyo-seop as Park Chul-soo — A former soccer player and a soccer coach at the training center. He is actually from a rich family but after refusing to work at the family business, he decides to run away and cut all financial ties with them, causing him to sleep in the night duty room at the training center. He eventually dates Ra-young after confessing his feelings to her. Due to her influence, his father eventually approves of Ra-young and decides to support his interest and career choice instead of forcing him to work for the family business.

Supporting

Byun's household

 Lee Mi-do as Kim Yoo-joo — She is Gabi Entertainment Art Team Leader and Joon-young's wife after he got her pregnant. She bullied Mi-young back in high school because she was jealous how Mi-young's father treated her. Yoo-joo's mother left her which caused her father to get remarried.
 Park Hye-sook as Kim Mal-boon — Na Young-shil and Na Young-shik's mother.
 Lee Jun-hyeok as Na Young-shik — Na Young-shil's younger brother and Lee Bo-mi's husband. His family was doing well with business until his business partner stole all his money and ran away which caused his family to be bankrupt. His former business partner later comes back and gives half the money back and uses that money to open a pizza parlor after winning a pizza contest with his wife.
 Jang So-yeon as Lee Bo-mi — Na Young-shik's wife. She tries to make a living by selling homemade dish rags after her husband's business went bankrupt. After winning a pizza contest with her husband and getting pregnant with twins, she eventually opens the pizza parlor with her family.
 Jung Joon-won as Na Min-ha — Na Young-shik and Lee Bo-mi's son. He is a straight A student who is always the top of his class. He gets invited to be enrolled at a Science and Technology High School but chooses not to due to tuition. After meeting a pretty math teacher from a different high school, he decides to go there instead.

Cha Jung-hwan's family
 Kang Seok-woo as Cha Kyoo-taek – Cha Jung-hwan's father and a retired journalist who never got a scope. Although he retired, he never cares for his wife Oh Bok-nyeo and only cares for his dog Chico. 
 Song Ok-sook as Oh Bok-nyeo – Cha Jung-hwan's mother and the owner of the building Lee Yoon-seok and his family lives in. She tries really hard to get her husband to pay attention to her no matter how hard she tries. She was really against the idea of Jung-hwan and Hye-young dating and she is against it more after getting into a fight with Na Young-shil.

People around Park Chul-soo
 Song Won-seok as Park Young-hee — Park Chul-soo's brother
 Lee Hyun-joo
 Yang Hak-jin as Yeon Tae-soo
 Lee Byung-joon as Park Hong-ik — Park Chul-soo's father

Extended

 Jung Hee-tae as Kang Woo-sung — Gabi Entertainment General Manager
 Kang Da-bin as Jin Sung-joon — Popular actor
 Sora Jung as Ahn Soo-jin — Joong-hee's mother
 Nam Tae-bu as Nam Tae-bu — Ahn Joong-hee's manager
 Lee Bong-ryun as Yoon-ryeon	
 Choi Dae-sung as Deputy Director — Director of Jung-hwan's Broadcasting Station
 Jung Soo-kyo as Jong-bum — Jung-hwan's junior PD
 Kim Da-ye as Im Yeon-ji — Jung-hwan's junior PD
 Yoon Young-min as Team leader Lee Se-jin — Gabi Entertainment Management Team Manager
 Lee Chang as Ryoo Gyoon-sang — Director of the drama 'Oh My Boss'
 Jo Hyun-jin as Team leader Lim Jung-yoon — Gabi Entertainment Art Team Leader
 Jo Wang-ki as Joong-hee's acting teacher
 Choi Dae-hoon as PD Lee
 Park Seo-young as Mathematics teacher of Onjeong high school
 Song Min-ji as Hye-young's friend
 Choi Na-moo as Mi-young's high school alumnus
 So Hee-jung as Yoo-joo's mother
 Park Min-jung as Actress
 Han Choon-il as Real estate owner
 Park Seung-tae as deceased Han-soo's aunt
 Jun Hyun-tae as Community center's chief
 Hong Yi-joo as Community center's Yoga Instructor 1
 Jun Hye-young as Community center's Yoga Instructor 2
 Yoo Il-han as Community center's Yoga Instructor 3
 Kim Bo-neui as Gabi Entertainment Art Team Staff
 Lee Seung-joon as Reporter Kim Geun-soo
 Sung Chan-ho as Senior corporate executive
 Yeo Un-bok as Pizza House manager
 Choi Young as Central Police Station detective
 Jin Hyun-kwang as Attorney Lee Chan-soo
 Lee Jae-uk as Do Jung-tae
 Son Dong-hwa as Lee Shi-hoon
 Kim Jong-ho as Photographer
 In Sung-ho
 Son Joo-won
 Jung Han-jin
 Ham Jin-sung
 Lee Hyun-joo
 Seo Kwang-jae
 Lee Eun-sung
 Kim Tae-rang
 Min Joon-hyun
 Lee Tae-gum
 Gong Yoon-chan
 Lee Seo-hwan
 Park Min-jung
 Kim Min-kyung
 Choi In-sook
 Kim Do-kyum

Special appearances

 Kim Jung-young as Yoon-seok's mother
 Jo Woo-jong as Love and Battlefield host
 Kwon Jae-kwang as 2 Day 1 NightTogether Director
 Kim Jung-ha
 Seo Yoon-ah as Hyun-ji — Ahn Joong-hee's ex-girlfriend
 Hak-jin as Yeon Tae-soo — Byun Ra-young's ex-boyfriend
 Im Chan-mi as Drama Staff
 Lee Na-eun as Drama Staff
 Uhm Ji-in
 Sung Hyuk as Moon Ji-sang

Original soundtrack

Part 1

Part 2

Part 3

Part 4

Ratings 
 In this table,  represent the lowest ratings and  represent the highest ratings.
NR denotes that the drama did not rank in the top 20 daily programs on that date.

Awards and nominations

Notes

References

External links
  
 
 
 

Korean Broadcasting System television dramas
2017 South Korean television series debuts
2017 South Korean television series endings
Korean-language television shows
Television series by IHQ (company)